Robert L. Hass (born March 1, 1941) is an American poet. He served as Poet Laureate of the United States from 1995 to 1997. He won the 2007 National Book Award and shared the 2008 Pulitzer Prize for the collection Time and Materials: Poems 1997–2005. In 2014 he was awarded the Wallace Stevens Award from the Academy of American Poets.

Life
Hass's works are well known for their West Coast subjects and attitudes. He was born in San Francisco and grew up in San Rafael. He grew up with an alcoholic mother, a major topic in the 1996 poem collection Sun Under Wood. His older brother encouraged him to dedicate himself to his writing. Awestruck by Gary Snyder and Allen Ginsberg, among others in the 1950s Bay Area poetry scene, Hass entertained the idea of becoming a beatnik. He graduated from Marin Catholic High School in 1958. When the area became influenced by East Asian literary techniques, such as haiku, Hass took many of these influences up in his poetry. He has been hailed as "a lyrical virtuoso who is able to turn even cooking recipes into poetry".

Hass is married to the poet and antiwar activist Brenda Hillman, who is a professor at Saint Mary's College of California.

Career
Hass graduated from Saint Mary's College in Moraga, California in 1963, and received his MA and Ph.D. in English from Stanford University in 1965 and 1971 respectively. At Stanford he studied with the poet and critic Yvor Winters, whose ideas influenced his later writing and thinking. His Stanford classmates included the poets Robert Pinsky, John Matthias, and James McMichael. Hass taught literature and writing at the University at Buffalo in 1967. From 1971 to 1989, he taught at his alma mater St. Mary's, at which time he transferred to the faculty of University of California, Berkeley. He has been a visiting faculty member in the Iowa Writers' Workshop at the University of Iowa on several occasions, and was a panelist at the Workshop's 75th anniversary celebration in June 2011.

From 1995 to 1997, during Hass's two terms as the US Poet Laureate (Poet Laureate Consultant in Poetry to the Library of Congress), he became a champion of literacy, poetry, and ecological awareness. He criss-crossed the country lecturing in places as diverse as corporate boardrooms and for civic groups, or as he has said, "places where poets don't go." After his self-described "act of citizenship," he wrote a weekly column on poetry in The Washington Post until 2000. He serves as a chancellor of the Academy of American Poets, was a trustee of the Griffin Poetry Prize (now trustee emeritus), and works actively for literacy and the environment.

As major influences on his poetry, Hass cites Beat poet Lew Welch, and has praised the slogan "Raid Kills Bugs Dead," which Welch crafted while working for an advertising firm. Additionally, he has named Chilean Pablo Neruda, Peruvian César Vallejo, and Polish poets Zbigniew Herbert, Wisława Szymborska, and Czesław Miłosz, whom he regards as the five most important poets of the last 50 years. While at Berkeley, Hass spent 15 to 20 years translating the poetry of Miłosz, his fellow Berkeley professor and neighbor, as part of a team with Robert Pinsky and Miłosz.

In 1999 Hass appeared in Wildflowers, the debut film by director Melissa Painter. In the film Hass plays The Poet, a writer who is dying of an unnamed chronic illness. Excerpts from his poetry are included in the script, primarily read by Hass and actress Daryl Hannah.

Poetry
Hass's poems tend to vary in structure as he alternates between prose-like blocks and free verse. His poems have been said to have a stylistic clarity, seen in his simple, clear language and precise imagery. His collection Praise features themes of seasons, nature, location, and transformation, with a running motif of blackberries. Poet Stanley Kunitz said of Hass's work, "Reading a poem by Robert Hass is like stepping into the ocean when the temperature of the water is not much different from that of the air. You scarcely know, until you feel the undertow tug at you, that you have entered into another element."

The January 2017 "Gift Horse" episode of the TV series Madam Secretary alludes to Hass. At a presidential inauguration, the poet laureate character ("Roland Hobbs") recites a poem that describes "the privilege of being", an allusion to Hass's 1999 poem of that title.

Activism

Hass has been actively engaged in promoting ecoliteracy. In 1995 he began working with writer and environmentalist Pamela Michael on a program that encourages "children to make art and poetry about their watersheds" and fosters interdisciplinary environmental education. In April 1996, when he was poet laureate, he organized a 6-day conference at the Library of Congress that brought together American nature writers to celebrate writing, the natural world and community. His watershed program expanded into the non-profit organization River of Words.  River of Words provides tools for teaching ecoliteracy and holds an annual poetry and art contest for children and teens.

On November 9, 2011, while participating in an Occupy movement demonstration at UC Berkeley called Occupy Cal, a police officer hit Hass in the ribs with a baton. Another officer shoved his wife to the ground. Hass wrote about their experience in a November 19, 2011, New York Times opinion piece, "Poet-Bashing Police."

Published works

Poetry
Field Guide, New Haven: Yale University Press, 1973, 
Praise, New York: Ecco Press, 1979, ; Manchester, UK: Carcanet Press, 1981,  
Human Wishes, New York: Ecco Press, 1989, 
Sun Under Wood, Hopewell, NJ: Ecco Press, 1996, 
Time and Materials: Poems 1997–2005, Ecco Press, 2007, 
The Apple Trees at Olema: New and Selected Poems, Ecco Press, 2010, ; Tarset, UK: Bloodaxe Books, 
Summer Snow: New Poems, Ecco Press, 2020,

Criticism
"James Wright", in The Pure Clear Word: Essays on the poetry of James Wright, Dave Smith (editor), Urbana: University of Illinois Press, 1982, 
Twentieth Century Pleasures: Prose on Poetry. Ecco Press, 1984, 
"Edward Taylor: What was he up to?", in Green Thoughts, Green Shades: Essays by contemporary poets on the early modern lyric, Jonathan F. S. Post (editor), Berkeley: University of California Press, 2002, 
Now and Then: The Poet's Choice Columns, 1997–2000. Shoemaker & Hoard, 2007, 
What Light Can Do: Essays on Art, Imagination, and the Natural World. Ecco Press, 2012. 
A Little Book on Form: An Exploration into the Formal Imagination of Poetry. Ecco Press, 2017.

Translations
The Separate Notebooks, Czesław Miłosz (translated by Robert Hass and Robert Pinsky with the author and Renata Gorczynski), New York: Ecco Press, 1984, 
Unattainable Earth, Czesław Miłosz (translated by author and Robert Hass), New York: Ecco Press, 1986, 
Provinces, Czesław Miłosz (translated by author and Robert Hass), Hopewell, NJ: Ecco Press, 1991, 
The Essential Haiku: Versions of Bashō, Buson, and Issa, Bashō Matsuo, Buson Yosano, Issa Kobayashi (edited with verse translation by Robert Hass), Hopewell, NJ: Ecco Press, 1994, 
Facing the River: new poems, Czesław Miłosz (translated by author and Robert Hass), Hopewell, NJ: Ecco Press, 1995, 
Road-Side Dog, Czesław Miłosz (translated by author and Robert Hass), New York: Farrar, Straus and Giroux, 1998, 
Treatise on Poetry, Czesław Miłosz (translated by author and Robert Hass), New York: Ecco Press, 2001, 
Second Space: new poems, Czesław Miłosz (translated by author and Robert Hass), New York: Ecco Press, 2004, 
The Essential Neruda: Selected Poems, includes five translations by Robert Hass, San Francisco: City Lights 2004,

Awards and honors
 The Frost Place poet in residence (1978)
 Yale Series of Younger Poets Award, 1972, for Field Guide
 William Carlos Williams Award, 1979, for Praise
 National Book Critics Circle Award for criticism, 1984, for Twentieth Century Pleasures
 MacArthur Fellowship, 1984 National Book Critics Circle Award for poetry, 1996, for Sun Under Wood National Book Award, Poetry, 2007 for Time and Materials Pulitzer Prize, Poetry, 2008 (a split award) for Time and Materials Manhae Prize co-winner, 2009
 PEN/Diamonstein-Spielvogel Award for the Art of the Essay, What Light Can DoNotes

External links

Poems by Robert Hass and biography at PoetryFoundation.org
Hass's Academy of American Poets page

"Robert Hass: Online Interviews", Sarah Pollock, Modern American Poetry
Hass pays tribute to Griffin Trust Lifetime Recognition Award recipient Robin Blaser (audio clip)
 Two poems (Meditations at Lagunitas and Misery and Splendor) from the Robert Hass page, courtesy of UIUC.
"The Bard of Berkeley," Wall Street Journal, June 29, 2009
'Nature's Imaginative Beauty', review of The Apple Trees at Olema in the Oxonian Review'The Temptations of Art', review of "The Apple Trees at Olema" in The New Republic''

1941 births
Living people
American male poets
American Poets Laureate
MacArthur Fellows
Members of the American Academy of Arts and Letters
National Book Award winners
Pulitzer Prize for Poetry winners
Iowa Writers' Workshop faculty
University of California, Berkeley College of Letters and Science faculty
Saint Mary's College of California alumni
University at Buffalo alumni
Yale Younger Poets winners
PEN/Diamonstein-Spielvogel Award winners
20th-century American poets
21st-century American poets
20th-century translators
21st-century American translators
20th-century American male writers
21st-century American male writers
Translators of Pablo Neruda